Refuge du Col de la Vanoise is a refuge of Savoie, France. It lies in the Massif de la Vanoise range.

Mountain huts in the Alps
Mountain huts in France